Michael Carter II (born March 8, 1999) is an American football cornerback for the New York Jets of the National Football League (NFL). He played college football at Duke and was drafted by the Jets in the fifth round of the 2021 NFL Draft.

College career

Carter was ranked as a threestar recruit by 247Sports.com coming out of high school. He committed to Duke on July 4, 2016.

Professional career

Carter was drafted by the New York Jets with the 154th overall pick in the fifth round of the 2021 NFL Draft on May 1, 2021. Coincidentally, the Jets drafted another Michael Carter from rival school North Carolina in the fourth round of the draft earlier that day.

References

External links
Duke bio

1999 births
Living people
Players of American football from Georgia (U.S. state)
Sportspeople from the Atlanta metropolitan area
Duke Blue Devils football players
New York Jets players
People from Douglasville, Georgia
American football safeties